Molecular Evolutionary Genetics Analysis (MEGA) is computer software for conducting statistical analysis of molecular evolution and for constructing phylogenetic trees. It includes many sophisticated methods and tools for phylogenomics and phylomedicine. It is licensed as proprietary freeware. The project for developing this software was initiated by the leadership of Masatoshi Nei in his laboratory at the Pennsylvania State University in collaboration with his graduate student Sudhir Kumar and postdoctoral fellow Koichiro Tamura. Nei wrote a monograph (pp. 130) outlining the scope of the software and presenting new statistical methods that were included in MEGA. The entire set of computer programs was written by Kumar and Tamura. The personal computers then lacked the ability to send the monograph and software electronically, so they were delivered by postal mail. From the start, MEGA was intended to be easy-to-use and include solid statistical methods only.

MEGA version 2 (MEGA2), which was coauthored by an additional investigator Ingrid Jakobson, was released in 2001. All the computer programs and the readme files of this version could be sent electronically due to advances in computer technology. Around this time, the leadership of the MEGA project was taken over by Kumar (now at Temple University) and Tamura (now at Tokyo Metropolitan University). The monograph Molecular Evolutionary Genetics Analysis was often used as a textbook for new ways to study molecular evolution.

MEGA has been updated and expanded several times and currently all these versions are available from the MEGA website. The latest release, MEGA7, has been optimized for use on 64-bit computing systems. MEGA is in two version. A graphical user interface is available as a native Microsoft Windows program. A command line version, MEGA-Computing Core (MEGA-CC), is available for native cross-platform operation. The method is widely used and cited. With millions of downloads across the releases, MEGA is cited in more than 85,000 papers. The 5th version has been cited over 25,000 times in 4 years.

Release history

Features

Sequence alignment construction 
Alignment editor
Multiple sequence alignment
Sequencer (trace) file editor-viewer
Integrated web browser, sequence fetching

Data handling 
Handling ambiguous states: R, Y, T, etc.
Extended MEGA format to save all data attributes
Importing data from other formats: Clustal, Nexus, etc.
Data explorers
Visual specification of domains-groups

Genetic code table section 
Add-edit user defined tables
Compute statistical attributes of a code table
Include all known code tables

Real-time caption expert engine 
Generate captions for distance matrices, phylogenies, tests, alignments
Copy captions to external programs

Integrated text file editor 
Columnar block selection-editing
Line numbers
Utilities to format sequences, reverse complement etc.

Sequence data viewer 
Data export
Highlighting
Statistical quantities estimation

MCL-based estimation of nucleotide substitution patterns 
4x4 rate matrix
Transition-transversion rate ratios: k1, k2
Transition-transversion rate bias: R

Substitution pattern homogeneity test 
Composition distance
Disparity index
Monte-carlo test

Distance estimation methods 
Nucleotide-by-nucleotide
Synonymous-nonsynonymous: codon-by-codon
Protein distance
Distance calculations
Sequence diversity calculations
Variance calculations

Tests of selection 
Large sample Z-test
Fisher’s exact test
Tajima’s neutrality test

Molecular clock test 
Tajima’s relative rate test

Tree-making methods 
Neighbor joining
Minimum evolution method
UPGMA
Maximum parsimony
Maximum likelihood
Bootstrap phylogeny test
Confidence probability test
Distance matrix viewer

Tree explorers 
Phylogeny display
Divergence time estimation
Tree editing
Change tree size
Multiple tree display

External links

References

Data visualization software
Bioinformatics software